Alan Read may refer to:

 Alan Read (writer) (born 1956), writer and professor of theatre
 Alan Read (activist) (1945–1996), canal preservationist

See also
 Alan Reid (disambiguation)
 Allan Reid (disambiguation)
 Alan Reed (disambiguation)